The Arizona Instructional League (AIL), sometimes known informally as "instructs", is an American professional baseball league. The league was founded in 1958. Young major league prospects hone their skills in the AIL, while experienced players may go there to rehabilitate from an injury, to learn a new position or to refine a particular skill.

Purpose
The Arizona Instructional League, which plays its games each September and October, serves to develop players who have been drafted by teams in Major League Baseball (MLB). Players in the AIL are often young prospects in their early minor league careers. An older player may go to "instructs" to hone a particular skill or to learn a new position.

The league is similar to the Florida Instructional League and was used as a more formal minor league during the 1960s and 1970s, prior to the formation of the Arizona League.

References

External links
Baseball Reference

Baseball leagues in Arizona
Professional sports leagues in the United States
1958 establishments in Arizona
Sports leagues established in 1958